Thereuopoda longicornis, also known as the long-legged centipede, is a species of centipede in the Scutigeridae family. It was first described in 1793 by Danish zoologist Johan Christian Fabricius.

Distribution
The species has a wide range through southern and south-eastern Asia, extending to Queensland in north-eastern Australia.

Behaviour
The centipedes are solitary terrestrial predators that inhabit plant litter and soil.

References

 

 
longicornis
Centipedes of Australia
Arthropods of Asia
Animals described in 1793
Taxa named by Johan Christian Fabricius